Wolfina is a genus of fungi in the family Chorioactidaceae. There are three species in the genus, found in the USA and China.

References

External links

Pezizales
Pezizales genera